In mathematics, an antihomomorphism is a type of function defined on sets with multiplication that reverses the order of multiplication.  An antiautomorphism is a bijective antihomomorphism, i.e. an antiisomorphism, from a set to itself. From bijectivity it follows that antiautomorphisms have inverses, and that the inverse of an antiautomorphism is also an antiautomorphism.

Definition
Informally, an antihomomorphism is a map that switches the order of multiplication.

This definition is equivalent to that of a homomorphism  (reversing the operation before or after applying the map is equivalent).

Examples
In group theory, an antihomomorphism is a map between two groups that reverses the order of multiplication.  So if  is a group antihomomorphism, 
φ(xy) = φ(y)φ(x)
for all x, y in X.

The map that sends x to x−1 is an example of a group antiautomorphism. Another important example is the transpose operation in linear algebra, which takes row vectors to column vectors. Any vector-matrix equation may be transposed to an equivalent equation where the order of the factors is reversed.

With matrices, an example of an antiautomorphism is given by the transpose map. Since inversion and transposing both give antiautomorphisms, their composition is an automorphism.

In ring theory, an antihomomorphism is a map between two rings that preserves addition, but reverses the order of multiplication.  So  is a ring antihomomorphism if and only if:
φ(1) = 1
φ(x + y) = φ(x) + φ(y)
φ(xy) = φ(y)φ(x)
for all x, y in X.

For algebras over a field K, φ must be a K-linear map of the underlying vector space. If the underlying field has an involution, one can instead ask φ to be conjugate-linear, as in conjugate transpose, below.

Involutions
It is frequently the case that antiautomorphisms are involutions, i.e. the square of the antiautomorphism is the identity map; these are also called s. For example, in any group the map that sends x to its inverse x−1 is an involutive antiautomorphism.

A ring with an involutive antiautomorphism is called a *-ring,  and these form an important class of examples.

Properties
If the source X or the target Y is commutative, then an antihomomorphism is the same thing as a homomorphism.

The composition of two antihomomorphisms is always a homomorphism, since reversing the order twice preserves order. The composition of an antihomomorphism with a homomorphism gives another antihomomorphism.

See also
 Semigroup with involution

References

Morphisms